Guzmania lingulata, the droophead tufted airplant or scarlet star, is a species of flowering plant in the family Bromeliaceae, subfamily Tillandsioideae. This evergreen epiphytic perennial is native to rainforest habitats in Central America, northern and central South America and southern Mexico. The Latin word lingulata means "tongue-shaped". The foliage grows in a star-shaped basal rosette culminating in an orange and red bracted inflorescence.  It is among the most commonly cultivated bromeliad types, with cultivars producing flowers in shades of maroon, red, orange, yellow or pink.

Varieties
Four varieties are recognized:

Guzmania lingulata var. cardinalis (André) Mez - Colombia, Ecuador
Guzmania lingulata var. concolor Proctor & Cedeño-Mald. - Central America, West Indies, northern and central South America (Guianas and Colombia south to Bolivia), southern Mexico
Guzmania lingulata var. flammea (L.B.Sm.) L.B.Sm. - Colombia, Ecuador
Guzmania lingulata var. lingulata - Guyana, Suriname, Jamaica, Venezuelan Antilles; naturalized in Bermuda

References

External links

FCBS Guzmania photos

lingulata
House plants
Flora of South America
Flora of Central America
Flora of Mexico
Flora of the Caribbean
Plants described in 1753
Taxa named by Carl Linnaeus
Flora without expected TNC conservation status